Idaho Legislative District 9 is one of 35 districts of the Idaho Legislature. It is currently represented by Abby Lee, Republican  of Fruitland, Ryan Kerby, Republican of  New Plymouth, and Judy Boyle, Republican of Midvale.

District profile (1992–2002) 
From 1992 to 2002, District 9 consisted of all of Payette and Washington Counties and a portion of  Gem County.

District profile (2002–2012) 
From 2002 to 2012, District 9 consisted of all of Adams, Payette, and Washington Counties and a portion of Canyon County.

District profile (2012–2022) 
District 9 currently consists of all of Adams, Payette, and Washington Counties and a portion of  Canyon County.

District profile (2022–) 
In December 2022, District 9 will consist of all of Payette and Washington Counties and a portion of Canyon County.

See also

 List of Idaho Senators
 List of Idaho State Representatives

References

External links
Idaho Legislative District Map (with members)
Idaho Legislature (official site)

09
Adams County, Idaho
Payette County, Idaho
Washington County, Idaho
Canyon County, Idaho